Palakkad Sreeram (born 16 February 1972) is an Indian film singer, who has worked predominantly in Tamil movie industry. Vetri Kodi Kattu in Padayappa and Liquid Dance in Slumdog Millionaire are some of his notable works.

Family and early life 
Sreeram was born on 16 February 1972 in a Tamil Iyer family to Smt. Jayalaksmi and Sri. K. S. Lakshmi Narayanan in a village, Kavassery near Alathur, Palakkad district in Kerala. He completed his post graduation in Music from Govt.College Chittur, Calicut University and moved to Madras for his musical journey. Married to Baby, a vocalist and composer and they have two children named Bharath and Anagha. Sreeram own a recording studio "Swararnavam".

Career 
Sreeram started learning music under his mother from very young age and also under Sri. Sundareswara bhagavathar, and he had an immense passion on Musical Instruments. He has many film songs in Tamil, Telugu and Malayalam. He owns an audio label Swararnavam, has scored music for two Malayalam films Mazhamegha Pravukal and Melvilasam Seriyanu. He moved to Chennai in 1995 soon after marriage and he had learnt flute by himself. He made his debut in the film industry as a flutist in 1996.

Filmography

Reference

External links 
 

Tamil playback singers
1972 births
Living people